The 1967 Colorado Buffaloes football team represented the University of Colorado at Boulder as a member of the Big Eight Conference during the 1967 NCAA University Division football season. Led by fifth-year head coach Eddie Crowder, the Buffaloes compiled an overall record of 9–2 with a mark of 5–2 conference play, tying for second place in the Big 8. Colorado was invited to the Bluebonnet Bowl, where they beat the Miami Hurricanes.

Colorado played in the inaugural game at Autzen Stadium in Eugene, Oregon, a  victory over the Oregon Webfoots. For the first time in six years, the Buffaloes defeated Nebraska, the conference champion the previous four years. Colorado did not win another game in the rivalry until 1986.

Senior safety Dick Anderson was a consensus All-American and played ten years with the Miami Dolphins.

Schedule

NFL Draft
Seven Buffaloes were selected in the 1968 NFL/AFL draft, the second common draft, which lasted seventeen rounds (462 selections).

References

External links
 University of Colorado Athletics – 1967 football roster
 Sports-Reference – 1967 Colorado Buffaloes

Colorado
Colorado Buffaloes football seasons
Bluebonnet Bowl champion seasons
Colorado Buffaloes football